, also called , was the gate built at the southern end of the monumental Suzaku Avenue in the ancient Japanese cities of Heijō-kyō (Nara) and Heian-kyō (Kyoto), in accordance with the Chinese grid-patterned city layout. At the other far north-end of Suzaku Avenue, one would reach the Suzakumon Gate, the main entrance to the palace zone. , the southern end of Suzaku Avenue and the possible remainder of the equivalent gate in Fujiwara-kyō (Kashihara) are yet to be discovered.

Name 
The gate's name in modern Japanese is Rajōmon. Rajō (羅城) refers to city walls and mon (門) means "gate," so Rajōmon signifies the main city gate. Originally, this gate was known as Raseimon or Raiseimon, using alternate readings for the kanji in the name. The name Rashōmon, using the kanji 羅生門 (which can also be read Raseimon), was popularized by a noh play Rashōmon (c.1420) written by Kanze Nobumitsu (1435–1516).

The modern name, Rajōmon, uses the original kanji (羅城門 rather than 羅生門) and employs the more common reading for the second character (jō instead of sei).

Rashōmon in Kyoto (Heian-kyō) 

The Rashōmon in Kyoto was the grander of the two city gates built during the Heian period (794–1185). By the 12th century it had fallen into disrepair and had become an unsavory place, with a reputation as a hideout for thieves and other disreputable characters. People would abandon corpses and unwanted babies at the gate.

The ruined gate is the central setting — and provides the title — for Ryūnosuke Akutagawa's short story "Rashōmon" and hence for Akira Kurosawa's 1950 film. Akutagawa's use of the gate was deliberately symbolic, with the gate's ruined state representing the moral and physical decay of Japanese civilization and culture. According to one legend, it was even inhabited by the demon Ibaraki Dōji.

Today, not even a foundation stone of the gate remains. This stretch of Kujō is designated Route 171, and is just west of Route 1. A wooden sign written in Japanese and English explains the history and significance of the gate. The site is behind a nondescript shop on Kujō street, and sits directly next to a small playground. Though a nearby bus stop is named Rajōmon, those unfamiliar with the area are likely to miss the Rashōmon site.

Rajōmon in Nara (Heijo-kyō) 
The Rajōmon in Nara stood about 4 km south of the Suzakumon of Heijō Palace. Their foundation stones were found in the excavations conducted between 1969 and 1972. From the remaining foundations, the width of the gate is estimated to have been 41.5 m.

Some of the foundation stones were reused in the 16th century by Toyotomi Hidenaga, who was expanding his castle in Kōriyama.

See also 

Suzakumon, the southern gate on ancient palace grounds

References 

Gates in Japan
Buildings and structures in Kyoto